Ecklonia stolonifera (Japanese: ツルアラメ, turuarame) is a brown alga species in the genus Ecklonia found in the Sea of Japan. It is an edible species traditionally eaten in Japan.

Chemistry

Phlorotannins 
Ecklonia stolonifera contains the phlorotannins phlorofucofuroeckol A, eckol, dieckol, dioxinodehydroeckol (eckstolonol), 2-phloroeckol, phlorofucofuroeckol B, 6,6'-bieckol, triphlorethol-A, phloroglucinol and 7-phloroeckol.

Those phlorotannins are responsible for the potent pharmacological effects associated with this seaweed. These molecules show a hepatoprotective activity.

Oxylipins 
The oxylipins ecklonialactones A, B, C, D, E and F and fucosterol can also be isolated from the species.

References

External links 

 algaebase.org

stolonifera
Plants described in 1913
Edible seaweeds